Maharaja Agrasen Himalayan Garhwal University formerly Himalayan Garhwal University is a State Private University located in Pauri Garhwal district, Uttarakhand, India. Maharaja Agrasen Himalayan Garhwal University (MAHGU) is established and incorporated by Government of Uttarakhand Act No. 33 of 2016. Vide Notification no. XXXVI (3)/2016/48(1)/2016) of Uttarakhand Shashan (Vidhayee & Sansdiya Karyavibhag) and under Section 2(f) of the University Grant Commission (UGC) Act, 1956. Himalayan Garhwal University is situated close to Garhwal ranges of Shivalik hills.

Awards 
 Maharaja Agrasen Himalayan Garhwal University was awarded Best University in North India for Industry Interface 2022  (CEGR).
 Maharaja Agrasen Himalayan Garhwal University Awarded with title "Best University for Hilly Region 2022" for outstanding contribution to Education, Skill and Research by India International Centre, New Delhi during 6th National Excellence Award Ceremony 2022 on 30th July, 2022.

Courses offered
Maharaja Agrasen Himalayan Garhwal University offers Bachelor's and Master's degree education to students across the globe. It also provides scholarships to students with some criteria. Here's the list of degree programmes at various faculties that MAHGU offers:-

 Engineering.
 IT & Computer Applications.
 Management.
 Science.
 Hospitality and Hotel Management.
 Law.
 Design.
 Humanities.
 Doctoral Programme (PhD).

References

External links

Results of University https://www.hguniversity.com/

 LinkedIn Page
 YouTube Page

Universities and colleges in Uttarakhand
Private universities in India
2016 establishments in Uttarakhand
Educational institutions established in 2016
Pauri Garhwal district